Sam Louwyck (born 1966) is a Belgian actor and singer.

Filmography

Theatre

External links 

 

1966 births
Living people
Entertainers from Bruges
20th-century Belgian male actors
21st-century Belgian male actors
Belgian male film actors